In radiometry, radiant exitance or radiant emittance is the radiant flux emitted by a surface per unit area, whereas spectral exitance or spectral emittance is the radiant exitance of a surface per unit frequency or wavelength, depending on whether the spectrum is taken as a function of frequency or of wavelength. This is the emitted component of radiosity. The SI unit of radiant exitance is the watt per square metre, while that of spectral exitance in frequency is the watt per square metre per hertz (W·m−2·Hz−1) and that of spectral exitance in wavelength is the watt per square metre per metre (W·m−3)—commonly the watt per square metre per nanometre. The CGS unit erg per square centimeter per second is often used in astronomy. Radiant exitance is often called "intensity" in branches of physics other than radiometry, but in radiometry this usage leads to confusion with radiant intensity.

Mathematical definitions

Radiant exitance
Radiant exitance of a surface, denoted  ("e" for "energetic", to avoid confusion with photometric quantities), is defined as

where
 is the partial derivative symbol,
 is the radiant flux emitted, and
 is the surface area.

If we want to talk about the radiant flux received by a surface, we speak of irradiance.

The radiant exitance of a black surface, according to the Stefan–Boltzmann law, is equal to:

For a real surface, the radiant exitance is equal to:

where  is the emissivity of that surface.

Spectral exitance
Spectral exitance in frequency of a surface, denoted Me,ν, is defined as

where  is the frequency.

Spectral exitance in wavelength of a surface, denoted Me,λ, is defined as

where  is the wavelength.

The spectral exitance of a black surface around a given frequency or wavelength, according to the Lambert's cosine law and the Planck's law, is equal to:

where
 is the Planck constant,
 is the frequency,
 is the wavelength,
 is the Boltzmann constant,
 is the speed of light in the medium,
 is the temperature of that surface.
For a real surface, the spectral exitance is equal to:

SI radiometry units

See also
Radiosity

References

Physical quantities
Radiometry